The Hames Valley AVA is an American Viticultural Area located in Monterey County, California at about 35°52'N 120°52'W, about 2 km west of US Route 101. It became an AVA in 1994. It is part of the larger Monterey AVA, and is located at the southern end of the Salinas Valley in the foothills of the Santa Lucia Range.  The soil in the valley is shale and loam, and the climate is slightly warmer than other regions of Monterey.  In addition to Bordeaux varietals, traditional Port grapes such as Tinta Cao and Touriga Nacional are grown in the valley. One recent significant wine is the 2008 Nybakken "IV Amici" Petite Syrah.

Venoco has drilled exploratory fracking wells in the region (near San Ardo to drill for petroleum in the shale in the area, as well as in Los Alamos, California in Santa Barbara County.

References

External links
Monterey County Vintners and Growers Association

American Viticultural Areas
American Viticultural Areas of California
Geography of Monterey County, California
1994 establishments in California